The , often shortened to NIFF, is a biennial film festival held in Nara, Nara, Japan.

Overview 
When Nara-based filmmaker Naomi Kawase won the Grand Prix at the Cannes Film Festival in 2007 with the film  The Mourning Forest, which is set in the Tawara district of Nara, she proposed holding an international film festival in Nara. Having realized the meaning of international film festivals, Kawase wanted to repay her hometown for its kindness and enliven the town with cultural events. Attracting many supporters and volunteers from Nara, the Nara International Film Festival Organizing Committee (an incorporated non-profit organization) was established. The first Nara International Film Festival was held in 2010 with the financial support of mainly local companies, government subsidies, and contributions from individuals who donated ¥10,000 for a NIFF membership.

Competition

New talent competition category (International competition) 
Films in this category must be a director’s first or second feature as well as Japan premiere. The first-prize winner will be honored with a Golden SHIKA Award and also be granted with a privilege to make the next NARAtive project film

NARA-wave 
Student film competition category

This category introduces student films, videos, and moving image arts regardless of genre or length. The first-prize winner will be honored with a Golden KOJIKA Award.

NARAtive project 
NARAtive project is designed to promote Nara to the world by making a film in Nara. “NARAtive” is a created word by combining Nara and narrative. Young and emerging talented directors are invited to make films set in Nara. Leading professional film crews and local communities support their shootings. In principle, the right of NARAtive film production is given to the winner of Golden SHIKA Award at each festival. It’s a continuous project. The purpose of the project is to cultivate young filmmakers who will bear the next generation and to contribute to the revitalization of local communities.

Previous NIFF

NIFF 2016 
Number of films screened: 65
Number of visitors: 31,451

International competition  
“Hedi Schneider Is Stuck” (2015/ Germany, Norway) Director: Sonja Heiss

“PURE WHITE” (2015/ Japan) Director: Yoshihiro Sakamoto

“THE BEEKEEPER AND HIS SON” (2016/ Switzerland, Canada) Director: Diedie Weng

“How to Win at Checkers (Every Time)” (2015/ Thailand, USA, Hong Kong, Indonesia) Director: Josh Kim:

“Golden Kingdom” (2015/ USA) Director: Brian Perkins

“Old Stone” (2016/ China, Canada) Director: Johnny Ma

“Nahid” (2015/ Iran) Director: Ida Panahandeh

NARA-wave 2016 
“NAMI TO TOMONI” Director: Bilal Kawazoe

“BOKU TO DAGASHI NO IE” Director: Kenta Tanaka

“PASSING SHOWER” Director: Masamoto Inada

“TOKERU” Director: Aya Igashi

“CHILDREN ON SOME DAYS” Director: Tomohiro Hirota

“THE SCENE OF YOUTH” Director: Sho Kurihara

“HIDE & SEEK” Director: Kimie Tanaka

“CHOCOLATE CAKE AND HORYUJI TEMPLE” Director: Keita Mukai

“KAWASAKI VELODROME” Director: Sayaka Mizuno

Nara Cinematheque 
Worried about the fact that no movie theater is located in the prefectural capital of Nara, NIFF Organizing Committee holds a monthly screening at various places to help Nara citizens make a habit of going to the movies. Generally, screenings are organized on the second Friday, Saturday and Sunday of each month. A navigator appears before and after the screening, giving preshow introduction and post-show discussion with audience.

References

External links 
Nara International Film Festival Official Website
Nara International Film Festival Official Website 2016
Nara International Film Festival Facebook

Film festivals in Japan